The men's lightweight boxing competitions at the 2018 Commonwealth Games in Gold Coast, Australia took place between 5 and 14 April at Oxenford Studios. Lightweights were limited to those boxers weighing less than 60 kilograms.

Like all Commonwealth boxing events, the competition was a straight single-elimination tournament. Both semifinal losers were awarded bronze medals, so no boxers competed again after their first loss. Bouts consisted of three rounds of three minutes each, with one-minute breaks between rounds. Beginning this year, the competition was scored using the "must-ten" scoring system.

Schedule
The schedule is as follows:

All times are Australian Eastern Standard Time (UTC+10)

Medalists

Results
The draw is as follows:

References

Boxing at the 2018 Commonwealth Games